Earthly Delights is a record label founded in 1986 by Nigel Ayers of Nocturnal Emissions.  The label's name refers to Hieronymous Bosch's painting The Garden of Earthly Delights.

Vinyl Releases

Caroline K Now Wait For Last Year LP EARTH001 (1987)

Nocturnal Emissions The World is My Womb LP EARTH002 (1987)

Spanner Thru Ma Beatbox  LP  EARTH003 LP (1987)

Nocturnal Emissions  Spiritflesh LP EARTH004 LP (1988)

Nocturnal Emissions  Beyond Logic Beyond Belief LP EARTH005 LP (1990)

Nocturnal Emissions  Mouth of Babes LP EARTH006 LP (1990)

Nocturnal Emissions Energy Exchange  EARTH007 LP (1991)

Nocturnal Emissions The Quickening EARTH008 LP (1993)

Compact Disc Releases

Nocturnal Emissions Practical Time Travel CD001 (1998)

Nocturnal Emissions Electropunk Karaoke CD002 (2000)

Nocturnal Emissions feat. Zoviet France Live in Vienna CD003 (2005)

Nocturnal Emissions Transearth CD004 (2005)

Nocturnal Emissions Music For Butoh   CD005 (2005)

Nocturnal Emissions Reliquary CD006 (2005)

Nocturnal Emissions  Holy of Holies (Four CD Set) CD007 (2005)

Nocturnal Emissions  Timeslip Earthly Delights CD008 (2006)

Nocturnal Emissions  Ophiuchus  Earthly Delights CD009 (2006)

Co-productions
Le Forbici Di Manitu play and remix Lieutenant Murnau (1980-1984)  ED188CD (2000)

(Earthly Delights with Soleilmoon Recordings)

Artists

Caroline K
Le Forbici Di Manitu
Lieutenant Murnau
Nocturnal Emissions
Spanner Thru Ma Beatbox
Zoviet France

See also
 List of record labels
 Soleilmoon

References

External links
 Earthly Delights web site

British record labels
Record labels established in 1986
Experimental music record labels
Industrial record labels
Noise music record labels
1986 establishments in the United Kingdom